Willie Overtoom (born 2 September 1986) is a Cameroonian former professional footballer who played as an offensive midfielder. He is the son of a Dutch father and a Cameroonian mother, and has lived the first three years of his life in Cameroon before moving to the Netherlands. Overtoom holds a Dutch passport.

Club career
Overtoom started playing football at amateur side Victoria Obdam and became an exponent of the AZ youth academy at the age of 13. During the 2006–07 season, Overtoom was sent on loan to Telstar, where he played nine matches in the Eerste Divisie. After his expiring contract was not extended, he started playing for Hoofdklasse side Hollandia. He impressed during the season and was able to sign with Eredivisie side Heracles Almelo the following season. He became an important player for the side from Almelo, where he spent four and a half years, before returning to his former team AZ in January 2013. However, his move did not become a success. On 28 August 2014, it was announced that Overtoom had left the club as a free agent, having only played 17 Eredivisie matches.

International career
Overtoom played for several Netherlands national youth squads without receiving an invitation for the senior national team. In 2011, he announced the application for a Cameroonian passport so he would be granted permission to represent Cameroon national team. On 15 March 2012, Overtoom received his first call-up to the Indomitable Lions.

He made his international debut in a friendly match against Guinea national football team on 26 May 2012.

Honours
AZ Alkmaar
KNVB Cup: 2012–13

References

External links
 
 Voetbal International profile 

1986 births
Living people
Dutch footballers
AZ Alkmaar players
SC Telstar players
Heracles Almelo players
Al-Shamal SC players
S.V. Zulte Waregem players
Eredivisie players
Eerste Divisie players
Belgian Pro League players
People from Bertoua 
People from Koggenland 
Association football midfielders
Qatari Second Division players
HVV Hollandia players
Cameroonian footballers
Dutch sportspeople of African descent
Dutch people of Cameroonian descent
Footballers from North Holland
Cameroonian people of Dutch descent
Cameroonian expatriate footballers
Dutch expatriate footballers
Dutch expatriate sportspeople in Qatar
Cameroonian expatriate sportspeople in Qatar
Cameroonian expatriate sportspeople in Belgium
Dutch expatriate sportspeople in Belgium
Expatriate footballers in Belgium
Expatriate footballers in Qatar
Cameroon international footballers